Michael Lynch, MMG (24 April 1942 – 24 October 2008) was an Irish Army commandant, United Nations military observer, and a recipient of the Military Medal for Gallantry, the highest military decoration of Ireland.

Early life
Lynch was born in Dublin on 24 April 1942, the son of Colonel Thomas Lynch. He was educated at Newbridge College in County Kildare and attended Trinity College, Dublin for a year before enlisting as a cadet at the Military College in the Curragh Camp. He was commissioned as an officer in 1962 and assigned to the 2nd Infantry Battalion.

Military career
In 1965, Lynch began his overseas service with the Defence Forces as part of the United Nations Peacekeeping Force in Cyprus (UNFICYP). He served in the Sinai Peninsula in 1974, the desert between Egypt and Israel, as part of the UN force that supervised the ceasefire that saw the end of the Yom Kippur War.

In 1980, and already with significant overseas experience, Lynch began a tour of duty as a United Nations Military Observer in the Middle East. This tour took place against the backdrop of a civil war in Lebanon and in September 1982 Lynch was one of the first witnesses at the scene of the Sabra and Shatila massacre in Beirut.

Lynch is one of only six recipients of the Military Medal for Gallantry with Distinction, which was awarded after he recovered the bodies of UN colleagues who had driven into a minefield. Among the four UN observers killed was fellow Irish soldier, Commandant Michael Nestor from Newbridge. Lynch's citation reads:

Lynch took leave of the army in 1998, holding the rank of Camp Commandant, Clancy Barracks, Dublin.

Personal and later life
Michael Lynch was married to Áine and the couple had a daughter and three sons.

He had a long rugby career, starting with schools rugby at Newbridge College before going on to play as prop with North Kildare RFC, County Carlow Football Club and Lansdowne Football Club. He captained Monkstown Football Club to victory in the 1980 O'Connor Cup.

Upon retirement from the Defence Forces, Lynch ran the Orwell Lodge Hotel in Rathgar, Dublin for eight years before selling the hotel and established the El Comandante wine label in Mendoza, Argentina, in 2005.

Lynch became ill and died on 24 October 2008, aged 66.

Decorations

References

1942 births
2008 deaths
Irish Army officers
Military personnel from Dublin (city)
United Nations Military Observers (people)
People educated at Newbridge College
Alumni of Trinity College Dublin
Irish rugby union players
Irish emigrants to Argentina
Irish officials of the United Nations